Pirouz Got Castle is a historical castle located in Chabahar County in Sistan and Baluchestan Province, The longevity of this fortress dates back to the Parthian Empire and Sasanian Empire.

References 

Castles in Iran
Sasanian castles
Parthian castles